Newcastle Inner City Bypass is a road in Newcastle and Lake Macquarie, New South Wales, Australia. Originally cobbled together from a collection of arterial roads, it has been slowly upgraded and lengthened in sections over the years to a motorway-standard bypass through the inner western suburbs of Newcastle.

Route
The road is divided into five sections. The first, and southernmost, section is the West Charlestown Bypass, a  freeway standard road, which commences at the intersection with Pacific Highway at Bennetts Green and heads in a northerly direction. The second section leads up the ridge and consists of parts of Charlestown Road and Lookout Road as a divided dual-carriageway arterial road. The third section will be a freeway diverging from Lookout Road near the intersection of McCaffrey Drive, skirting around the west of John Hunter Hospital to join the next section at Newcastle Road, currently under construction. The fourth section is a freeway-standard bypass of Jesmond from Newcastle Road continuing north, and the fifth section is a freeway extension from the northern end of the Jesmond Bypass to terminate at the intersection with Pacific Highway at Sandgate.

With the third section of the route not yet completed, a more circuitous route through suburban roads remains in use for the gap between the second and fourth sections. From the end of the Charlestown Bypass, it is necessary to follow Lookout Road, which becomes Croudace Street, before turning left onto Newcastle Road. Approximately  after turning left, the Inner City Bypass is rejoined by turning right at the Jesmond roundabout.

History
The Newcastle Inner City Bypass route was first planned in the 1950s to connect the Bennetts Green area to Pacific Highway at Sandgate; it was approved in 1957 and subsequently incorporated in the Northumberland County Planning Scheme. The concept of the Newcastle Inner City Bypass emerged from the decision to route the Sydney to Newcastle Freeway west of Lake Macquarie in the mid-1970s: up to that point the freeway was proposed east of Lake Macquarie and involved corridor reservations for high-standard bypasses of Swansea, Belmont and Charlestown. The corridors for Swansea and Belmont have been abandoned, however the corridor from Bennetts Green to Sandgate was maintained by the Department of Main Roads to ultimately provide a bypass of inner Newcastle.

The passing of the Main Roads Act of 1924 through the Parliament of New South Wales provided for the declaration of Main Roads, roads partially funded by the State government through the Department of Main Roads (later Transport for NSW). State Highway 23 was declared along this road on 31 July 1946, from the intersection with Pacific Highway at Charlestown, along Charlestown Road via Kotara to Jesmond, and then via Birmingham Gardens along Sandgate Road to the intersection of Pacific Highway at Sandgate. The highway was redeclared along each section of the bypass as they opened.

The passing of the Roads Act of 1993 through the Parliament of New South Wales updated road classifications and the way they could be declared within New South Wales. Under this act, the declaration of Highway 23 runs from the intersection with Pacific Highway at Windale via West Charlestown Bypass, Charlestown and Lookout and Croudace Roads to Newcastle Road at Lambton, then from Newcastle Road at Jesmond to Pacific Highway at Sandgate. Despite its classification as a Highway, it still has no officially gazetted name, and is known only locally as Newcastle Inner City Bypass.

Newcastle Inner City Bypass was signed State Route 123 along its entire length in 1974, moving to new sections of the bypass as they opened. With the conversion to the newer alphanumeric system in 2013, this was replaced with route A37.

Construction
The Newcastle Inner City Bypass was not built in a contiguous fashion, with separate sections opened slowly at different times over the following 50 years.

The second section, a 2.4km-long section between Kotara and Rankin Park, was the subject of community debate regarding the location and standard of road to be constructed. In the late 1960s, the Department of Main Roads proposed to construct a major elevated roadway as part of this section, which would have required a strip acquisition of Blackbutt Reserve between Carnley Avenue and McCaffrey Drive. Community concerns against the proposal's effect on the environmentally-sensitive Blackbutt Reserve led to the abandonment of the route through Blackbutt Reserve and the existing Lookout Road section was widened and constructed as a four-lane dual-carriageway arterial road in lieu of freeway conditions, with at-grade intersections at Carnley Avenue, Hurn Street, Cardiff Road and Grandview Road, completed in 1983.

The fourth section of the bypass, a 3.2km-long section between Newcastle Road at Jesmond and Sandgate Road at Shortland and previously known as the "Jesmond to Shortland Relief Route", was the first portion of freeway-standard road to be approved in January 1981. Construction started in May 1984, and the road was opened to traffic in June 1993.

The first section, the 6.5km West Charlestown Bypass, commenced earthworks construction in July 2000, and was opened to traffic in early 2003. 

Pre-construction works for the fifth (northernmost) section, the 2.3km-long section between Sandgate Road at Shortland and Pacific Highway at Sandgate, began in June 2010. The work to be completed as part of that contract was for digging a cutting where the Sandgate Road bridge has been built over the bypass and filling two other areas, including constructing retaining walls and relocating water mains. The contract for construction of that section was awarded to Reed Constructions in February 2011, with work starting in April 2011. On 28 May 2012 Roads and Maritime Services terminated its contract with Reed Constructions which had been placed in liquidation, and remaining works were completed by Thiess, the prime contractor for the Hunter Expressway. The Shortland – Sandgate section of the bypass was unofficially opened on 16 January 2014 and opened to traffic on 23 January 2014.

In June 2014, the NSW Government announced it would provide $280 million to complete the third section (i.e. Rankin Park to Jesmond section) of the bypass, including $150 million from Restart NSW. It includes building a new and improved entrance to the John Hunter Hospital. In February 2019, it was approved by the state government. Major construction began in late 2021, targeting completion in mid 2025.

Interchanges

See also

 Highways in Australia
 List of freeways in Australia
 List of highways in New South Wales

References

External links
 Newcastle inner city bypass Sandgate to Shortland - Review of environmental factors
 ozroads page on NSW State Highway 23

Highways in New South Wales
Transport in Newcastle, New South Wales
Roads in the Hunter Region
City of Lake Macquarie
Proposed roads in Australia
Bypasses in Australia